Shinta (written: 真太 or 新太) is a masculine Japanese given name. Notable people with the name include:

 (born 2000), German footballer
 (born 1989), Japanese footballer
 (born 1971), Japanese video game designer
 (1927–2005), Japanese author and illustrator

Fictional characters
 Himura Kenshin, known in childhood as "Shinta"

Other meanings
 the name for Sita in Indonesian languages.

Japanese masculine given names